is a Japanese actor. He is known for his portrayal of Tsubasa Ozu/Magi Yellow in Mahou Sentai Magiranger, and later, Masato Jin/Beet Buster in Tokumei Sentai Go-Busters. He is currently serving as the Super Sentai Goodwill Ambassador since 2017.

Filmography
 Mahou Sentai Magiranger - Magi Yellow/Tsubasa Ozu (2005-2006)
 Mahou Sentai Magiranger the Movie: Bride of Infershia - Magi Yellow/Tsubasa Ozu (2005)
 Mahou Sentai Magiranger VS Dekaranger - Magi Yellow/Tsubasa Ozu (2006)
 Chō Ninja Tai Inazuma! - Senden/Kankichi (2006)
 Boys Love - Chidori Furumura (2006)
 GoGo Sentai Boukenger vs. Super Sentai - Magi Yellow/Tsubasa Ozu (2007)
 Musical Air Gear - Juliet (2007)
 Chō Ninja Tai Inazuma!! Spark - Senden/Kankichi (2007)
 Biyou Shounen★Celebrity - Rui (2007)
 Tokumei Sentai Go-Busters - Beet  Buster  /  Masato Jin (2012-2013)
 Tokumei Sentai Go-Busters the Movie: Protect the Tokyo Enetower! - Masato Jin/ Beet  Buster (2012)
 Tokumei Sentai Go-Busters vs. Kaizoku Sentai Gokaiger: The Movie - Masato Jin / Beet  Buster (2013)
 Zyuden Sentai Kyoryuger vs. Go-Busters: The Great Dinosaur Battle! Farewell Our Eternal Friends - Masato Jin / Beet  Buster (2014)
 Shuriken Sentai Ninninger - Tsubasa Ozu/Magi Yellow (2015)  -  cameo episodes 38
 Uchu Sentai Kyuranger - Minato Hoshi (2017)
 Kamen Rider × Super Sentai: Ultra Super Hero Taisen - Masato Jin / Beet  Buster (2017)
 Hero Mama League - Tsubasa Ozu (2018)
 Lupinranger VS Patranger VS Kyuranger - Minato Hoshi (2019)
 Mashin Sentai Kiramager - Ice pop seller (2020)  -cameo episodes 35
 Shikkokuten (2022)

References

External links
Official website 

Actors from Akita Prefecture
1986 births
Japanese male actors
Living people